Jagannath Mallick (10 July 1937 – 7 August 2016) was an Indian politician and the member of parliament. He initially served as the member of Odisha Legislative Assembly and the Agriculture and co-operation minister in the state or Odisha.

Life and background 
Mallick was born and raised in Mahantypatna, Mangalpur, Jajpur, Orissa. He did Bachelor of Arts and higher diploma in Cooperative education at Utkal University, Bhubaneswar. He was actively participating in social works and authored several books.

Career
Mallick was the member of Odisha Legislative Assembly from 1971 to 1994 and has served as cabinet minister from 1978 to 1980 and 1990 to 1994 of the Odisha state when affiliated with Pragati Legislature Party. It was 1999 when he contested first parliamentary elections on Biju Janata Dal's ticket and was elected the parliament member during the thirteenth general elections of India, and remained in office till the term ended.

Personal life 
Mallick was married to Kalyani Mallick on 7 July 1957 and was blessed with two daughters and one son.

Death
Mallick was suffering with kidney diseases and he was then taken to a private hospital where he remained under medical treatment for some days. However, on 7 April 2016, he died in hospital on Sunday due to kidney failure and multiple organ dysfunction.

References 

1937 births
India MPs 1999–2004
2016 deaths
People from Jajpur district
Indian politicians
Biju Janata Dal politicians
Janata Party politicians
Bharatiya Lok Dal politicians